Weerasooriya is a Sinhalese surname, with origins tracing back to South of Sri Lanka. The word Weera means brave or hero, and sooriya is meant to denote the ancestry and descent from the Kshatriya Solar Dynasty, which is quite common among Karava Names.

Notable people
Arnolis Weerasooriya (born 1854) - first Ceylonese Colonel, and Sinhalese member of the Salvation Army.
Srilal Weerasooriya (born 1943) - 15th Commander of the Sri Lankan Army and a former Sri Lankan High Commissioner to Pakistan
Tilak Weerasooriya (1967) - Sri Lankan Physician & Academic

References

External links 

Karava web site – Kshatriya Maha Sabha Sri Lanka

See also
 

Sinhalese surnames